Stepok is a rural locality (a selo) in Starodubsky District, Bryansk Oblast, Russia. The population was 122 as of 2010. There are 4 streets.

Geography 
Stepok is located 9 km east of Starodub (the district's administrative centre) by road. Desyatukha is the nearest rural locality.

References 

Rural localities in Starodubsky District